The Nigerian Army Band Corps (NABC) is the official military band of the Nigerian Army. It was founded as a regimental band in 1932, with Captain J. Cooper from the Royal Life Guards Band in London originally leading the band. In 1935, the NABC was converted into a full-fledged military band, being part of the Royal West African Frontier Force (RWAFF). Two years before the country's independence in 1960, the band was transferred from its rehearsal space in Kaduna to Abalti Barracks in Lagos. As part of the government policy of the replacement British citizens with native Nigerians in public roles, Captain Cooper was replaced in 1964 by Lieutenant Colonel Josef Olubobokun (1930–2015), who became the first native Nigerian to lead the band. During his tenure, he would become instrumental in the establishment of institutions such as the Nigerian Army School of Music.

Characteristics

Instrumentation
Musical accompaniment provided by band ranges from jazz and traditional music to military and classical music.

Requirements

Directors of Music
Captain J. Cooper (1932-1964)
Colonel Josef Olubobokun (1964-16 January 1984)
Lieutenant Colonel A.G. Ugwunze (16 January 1984-)
Lieutenant Colonel Eru
Lieutenant Colonel Sati
Brigadier General Luckson Amaechi
Colonel Gerald Nwasike  
Colonel O.G. Olaniyi (11 December 2019-Till Date)
Lieutenant Colonel A.G. Leku (19 February 2019-18 December 2019)
Lieutenant Colonel J. E Evans

See also
Presidential Guard Brigade (Nigeria)
Presidential Guard (Zimbabwe)
The Funkees

References

Military bands
Nigerian musical groups by genre
Nigerian Army
1932 establishments in Nigeria